Luke Davies (born 1962) is an Australian writer of poetry, novels and screenplays. His best known works are Candy: A Novel of Love and Addiction (which was adapted for the screen in 2006) and the screenplay for the film Lion, which earned him a nomination for the Academy Award for Best Adapted Screenplay. Davies also co-wrote the screenplay for the film News of the World.

Life and career
Davies studied Arts at the University of Sydney.

His first poetry collection Four Plots for Magnets was published in 1982 by S. K. Kelen at Glandular Press. Long out of print, it was republished (with additional poetry and prose) by Pitt Street Poetry in 2013. He co-wrote the screenplay for the 2006 film Candy with director Neil Armfield, based on his 1997 novel Candy. The film stars Heath Ledger and Abbie Cornish as struggling heroin addicts. Davies himself overcame heroin addiction in 1990.

Davies' other works include the novels Isabelle the Navigator and God of Speed, and several volumes of poetry – Four Plots for Magnets, Absolute Event Horizon, Running With Light, Totem and Interferon Psalms – as well as the chatbooks The Entire History of Architecture [...] and other love poems (Vagabond Press, 2001) and The Feral Aphorisms (Vagabond Press, 2011). Davies wrote the screenplays for Air (a 2009 short film which he also directed), Life, Lion, and the Felix van Groeningen drama Beautiful Boy. He wrote the screenplay for the 2020 film News of the World, adapted from  Paulette Jiles' novel, starring Tom Hanks .

Davies is also a film critic for The Monthly, and occasional book reviewer and essayist for other magazines and newspapers. 
In 2010 Davies won the John Curtin Prize for Journalism, at the Victorian Premier's Literary Awards, for his essay The Penalty Is Death, about the lives inside prison of Andrew Chan and Myuran Sukumaran, two drug runners on Bali's death row. (They would be executed by firing squad, to great public controversy, in 2015.)

His children's book, Magpie, was published by ABC Books in 2010. 

In May 2017 the ABC Television program Australian Story profiled Davies' life in a two-part episode.

Awards and nominations
1995: Turnbull Fox Phillips Poetry Prize Shortlisted for Absolute Event Horizon
1998: A Sydney Morning Herald Young Writer of the Year
2000: Queensland Premier's Literary Awards, Judith Wright Poetry Prize for Running With Light
2004: The Age Poetry Book of the Year for Totem
2004: Overall Age Book of the Year for Totem
2004: Grace Leven Prize for Poetry for Totem
2004: Philip Hodgins Memorial Medal at the Mildura Writer's Festival
2006: South Australian Premier's Awards, John Bray Poetry Award for Totem
2010: John Curtin Prize for Journalism at the Victorian Premier's Literary Awards for the essay The Penalty Is Death
2011: Southern California Journalism Awards for the essay The Cisco Kid (Finalist)
2012: Prime Minister's Literary Awards Poetry Winner for Interferon Psalms
2016: Critics' Choice Movie Award for Best Adapted Screenplay for Lion (Nominated)
2016: Satellite Award for Best Adapted Screenplay for Lion (Nominated)
2016: AWFJ EDA Award for Best Adapted Screenplay for Lion (Nominated)
2016: Hamilton Behind the Camera Awards for Breakthrough Screenwriter for Lion (Won)
2017: AACTA International Award for Best Screenplay for Lion (Nominated)
2017: USC Scripter Award for Best Screenplay for Lion (Nominated)
2017: Capri International Film Festival Award for Best Adapted Screenplay for Lion (Won)
2017: BAFTA for Best Adapted Screenplay for Lion (Won)
2017: Academy Award for Best Adapted Screenplay for Lion (Nominated)

Bibliography

Notes

References
ABC TV Sunday Arts 30 July 2006 Accessed: 16 July 2007
Steger, Jason (2004) "Love in the time of poetry" in The Age 21 August 2007 Accessed: 16 July 2007
 Candy Film Review

External links
 Profile on Davies in The Australian Weekend Magazine, March 2008

1962 births
Living people
20th-century Australian male writers
20th-century Australian novelists
20th-century Australian poets
21st-century Australian male writers
21st-century Australian novelists
Australian male novelists
Australian male poets
Best Adapted Screenplay BAFTA Award winners
The Monthly people
Writers from Sydney